Kalabagh  is a town and union council of Mianwali District in the Punjab province of Pakistan. It is part of Isakhel Tehsil. It is located on the western bank of the Indus River. It was the seat of the nawab of Kalabagh, who lived in the fort known locally as Qila Nawab Sahib. Kalabagh is known for its red hills of the salt range and the scenic view of the Indus traversing through the hills. It also produces handicrafts, especially footwear and Makhadi Halwa.

Etymlogy
Kala means "black", and Bagh means "garden". This name came about because its founders, the nawabs of Kalabagh, planted a lot of mango trees, and their dark green leaves looked black to travellers from afar in the dusty haze. Hence kalabagh simply means "black garden". This local town has geological importance for Pakistan.

See also
 Nawab Malik Amir Mohammad Khan
 Kalabagh Dam

References

 
Union councils of Mianwali District